Sén dollotar Ulaid ... is an Irish poem of uncertain date, possibly early 10th-century. It consists of nine quatrains, and lacks context. It appears to concern a raid by the men of Ulaid (Ulster) to Viking Scotland.

The text

.

Translation

 Luckily came the Ulaid to Lochlann/expeditiously/and fought nine battles/from year's end to year's end.

References

 'Sen dollotar Ulaid', E.J. Gwynn (ed. and trans.) 'Éiru' 10 (1926–27), 92-94:93.

Irish-language literature
Irish poems
Medieval poetry
Scandinavian Scotland